Tethyrhynchia is a monotypic genus of brachiopods belonging to the monotypic family Tethyrhynchiidae. The only species is Tethyrhynchia mediterranea.

The species is found in the Mediterranean Sea.

References

Rhynchonellida
Brachiopod genera
Monotypic brachiopod genera